Libéral Bruant (ca 1635 – Paris, 22 November 1697), was a French architect best known as the designer of the Hôtel des Invalides, Paris, which is now dominated by the dome erected by Jules Hardouin Mansart, his collaborator in earlier stages of the construction. A comparison of Bruant's central entrance to the Invalides, under an arched cornice packed with military trophies with Mansart's Église du Dome, gives a clear idea of the difference between Bruant's High Baroque and Hardouin-Mansart's restrained and somewhat academic Late Baroque.

Bruant was the most notable in a family that produced a long series of architects active from the 16th to the 18th century.

In 1660, Bryuant was the architect chosen for rehabilitations to Louis XIII's old arsenal (the Salpêtrière), which was being converted into what would become the world's largest hospice. It is now the Pitié-Salpêtrière Hospital.

In the Marais district of Paris, the hôtel particulier Bruant built for himself in 1685, at 1 rue de la Perle now houses the Bricard Lock Museum (Musée de la Serrure). Its Baroque façade of golden limestone is enlivened by windows set into blind arches that march across its front and busts in oval reserves, all under a richly-sculptured pediment that is pierced by an oval window.

In 1671, he became one of the first eight members of the Académie royale d'architecture, created by Louis XIV.

See also
 Architecture of Paris
 Les Invalides

External links

17th-century French architects
1630s births
1697 deaths
Architects from Paris
French Baroque architects
Members of the Académie royale d'architecture
Architects from Versailles